Central District is a district (bakhsh) in Avaj County, Qazvin Province, Iran. The District has one city: Avaj. The District has three rural districts (dehestan):Hesar-e Valiyeasr Rural District, Kharaqan-e Gharbi Rural District, and Shahidabad Rural District.

Districts of Qazvin Province
Avaj County